

British Empire
Berbice – Henry William Bentinck, Lieutenant Governor of Berbice (1814–1820)
India – Francis Rawdon-Hastings, 1st Marquess of Hastings, Governor-General of India (1813–1823)
Ionian Islands – Thomas Maitland, Lord High Commissioner (1816–1823)
Ireland – Charles Chetwynd-Talbot, 2nd Earl Talbot, Lord Lieutenant of Ireland (1817–1821)
Malta – Thomas Maitland, Governor of Malta (1813–1824)
New South Wales – Major-General Lachlan Macquarie, Governor of New South Wales (1810–1821)
Nova Scotia – George Ramsay, 9th Earl of Dalhousie, Lieutenant Governor of Nova Scotia (1816–1820)

Portugal
Angola –
 Luís da Mota Fêo e Torres, Governor of Angola (1816–1819)
 Manuel Vieira Tovar de Albuquerque, Governor of Angola (1819–1821)

Spanish Empire
Viceroyalty of New Granada – 
 Juan José Francisco de Sámano y Uribarri de Rebollar y Mazorra (1818–1819)
 Juan de la Cruz Mourgeón y Achet (1819–1821)
Viceroyalty of New Spain – Juan Ruíz de Apodaca, conde de Venadito (1816–1821)
Captaincy General of Cuba – 
 José Cienfuegos, Governor of Cuba (1816–1819)
 Juan María Echeverri, Governor of Cuba (1819)
 Juan Manuel Cajigal y Niño, Governor of Cuba (1819–1821)
Spanish East Indies – Mariano Fernández de Folgueras, Governor-General of the Philippines (1816–1822)
Captaincy General of Santo Domingo – Carlos de Urrutia y Montoya, Governor of Santo Domingo (1813–1819)
Viceroyalty of Peru – Joaquín de la Pezuela y Sánchez, marqués de Viluma (1816–1821)

Colonial governors
Colonial governors
1819